Grayce is a given name. Notable people with the name include:

Grayce Hampton (1876–1963), British film and stage actress
Grayce Sills (1926–2016), American psychiatric nurse, educator, author, and nurse administrator
Grayce Uyehara (1919–2014), Japanese-American social worker and activist

See also
Grace (given name)

Feminine given names